Amanda Micheli is an American director and the founder of Runaway Films. In June 2022 she signed with The United Talent Agency. 

In her latest film, HALFTIME, international icon Jennifer Lopez lays bare her evolution as a Latina, a mother, and an artist, taking agency in her
life and using her voice for a greater purpose. HALFTIME premiered at the Tribeca
film festival in June 2022 and had its world premiere on Netflix on June 14, 2022. 

Her 2018 film VEGAS BABY, which examines the complexities of America’s fertility industry, earned
an Emmy nomination for PBS. 

Micheli earned an Oscar nomination for La Corona, which follows an unlikely beauty pageant in a Colombian women’s prison. La Corona premiered at the Sundance Film Festival before airing on HBO. She also directed and shot Double Dare, which explores the lives of two Hollywood stuntwomen. Double Dare premiered at The Toronto International Film Festival and was broadcast on PBS before its theatrical release. Featuring interviews with Steven Spielberg, Quentin Tarantino, and Lynda Carter, it won numerous film festival awards. Her first film, Just for the Ride, about the cowgirls who founded the first professional sport in America, won a student Oscar and an International Documentary Association Award and premiered on the PBS series POV in 1996.

In 2014, Micheli produced Slomo, which won best short at SXSW and the International Documentary Association. She also co-directed One Nation Under Dog for HBO, which won a TV Academy honor for "Television with a Conscience", and The Save for ESPN. She was producer and cinematographer on Thin, the HBO film about anorexia. Also for HBO, she was producer and cinematographer on Cat Dancers, and supervising producer on Brave New Voices, a series about teen poetry. Other cinematography credits include: Morgan Spurlock’s premiere episode of 30 Days (FX), My Flesh and Blood (HBO), The Flute Player (PBS), and Witches in Exile.

Micheli is a graduate of Harvard University and a member of the Academy of Motion Picture Arts and Sciences. While pursuing feature-length projects, she has directed commercial work for clients including Nike, Google, and Verizon, and is a past visiting lecturer at Stanford’s MFA film program.

References

External links 

Year of birth missing (living people)
Living people
21st-century American women
American women film directors
Film directors from Massachusetts
Harvard University alumni
People from Boston